"Here with Me" is a song by American producer Marshmello, featuring Scottish band Chvrches. It was released on March 8, 2019 alongside an animated lyric video. The official music video was released on April 10, 2019.

Composition
"Here with Me" is composed in E-flat major. The song was called reminiscent of Marshmello's earlier electronic production work, with the opening being "markedly restrained" that "provides a rare chance for him to experiment with guitars." The instrumentation was also described as "acoustic guitars and EDM beats".

Promotion
Along with announcing the song, Marshmello posted a 19-second snippet of the song, with Your EDM saying that the collaboration sounds more like Marshmello's previous singles with vocalists instead of his Joytime album series material. On April 3, 2019, Marshmello and Chvrches gave a live performance of "Here with Me" on Jimmy Kimmel Live!.

Critical reception
Stereogum called it "standard-issue dance-pop fluff, with a bit more of an emotional pull to it thanks to Mayberry's performance. It's the sort of song that you might forget about immediately after hearing."

Chart performance
"Here with Me" became Marshmello's fourth number one (and his seventh top ten) and Chvrches' first on Billboards Dance/Mix Show Airplay chart. It is also the highest position peak for Chvrches on a Billboard airplay chart to date. It also reached the top twenty in Canada. It peaked at number nine on the UK Singles Chart. It charted at number 31 on the Billboard Hot 100 becoming Chvrches' first entry on the chart & their highest charting single in the country.

Credits and personnel
Credits adapted from Tidal.

 Marshmello – production, lyrics
 Steve Mac – additional production
 Lauren Mayberry – vocals, lyrics
 Iain Cook – guitar, lyrics
 Brandon Buttner – studio personnel, vocal engineering
 Martin Doherty – lyrics

Charts

Weekly charts

Year-end charts

Decade-end charts

Certifications

References

2019 singles
2019 songs
Marshmello songs
Chvrches songs
Geffen Records singles
Republic Records singles
Songs written by Steve Mac
Songs written by Marshmello
Songs written by Iain Cook
Songs written by Lauren Mayberry
Songs written by Martin Doherty
Dance-pop songs